The Market Street Bridge is a stone arch bridge that spans the Susquehanna River between Harrisburg, Pennsylvania, and Wormleysburg, Pennsylvania. The current structure is the third bridge built at its current location and is the second oldest remaining bridge in Harrisburg. The bridge carries BicyclePA Route J across the river.

The bridge was listed on the National Register of Historic Places on June 22, 1988 and was documented by the Historic American Engineering Record in 1997.

History

The Camelback Bridge was the first bridge built to cross the Susquehanna River. The Theodore Burr designed bridge was built by Jacob Nailor, starting in 1814, and was opened as a toll bridge in 1820. The Camelback remained the only bridge until the Walnut Street Bridge was built in 1890. In 1902, the Camelback Bridge was destroyed by a flood and in 1905 a two-lane replacement bridge was erected at the same location.  The current structure is the result of the widening of the replacement bridge in 1926. Columns at the Harrisburg entrance to the bridge were salvaged from the old State Capitol which burned in 1897.

See also
List of bridges documented by the Historic American Engineering Record in Pennsylvania
List of bridges on the National Register of Historic Places in Pennsylvania
List of crossings of the Susquehanna River
National Register of Historic Places listings in Dauphin County, Pennsylvania

References

External links

Bridges in Harrisburg, Pennsylvania
Bridges completed in 1928
Bridges over the Susquehanna River
Road bridges on the National Register of Historic Places in Pennsylvania
Bridges in Cumberland County, Pennsylvania
Historic American Engineering Record in Pennsylvania
Former toll bridges in Pennsylvania
1928 establishments in Pennsylvania
National Register of Historic Places in Cumberland County, Pennsylvania
Stone arch bridges in the United States